La Calmette is a commune in the Gard department in southern France.

Population

See also
Communes of the Gard department

References

External links

 The Regordane Way or St Gilles Trail, which passes through La Calmette

Communes of Gard